Richard Kay may refer to:

Richard Kay (actor) (1937–1985), English actor who appeared in Juliet Bravo
Richard Kay (anthropologist) (born 1947), professor at Duke University, United States
Richard Kay (producer) (fl. 1961), producer of The Golden Mistress and other films

See also
Richard Kaye (disambiguation)